Sarah Kiyingi Musoke (born on April 16, 1960) is a Ugandan politician, a former State Minister of Internal Affairs and a former Woman Representative Member of parliament representative for Rakai District since the Sixth Parliament of Uganda between 1996 to 2016.

Early life and education 
Sarah was born to David Livingstone (father) from Rakai District. She went to Bwanda Primary School before joining Kalagala Primary School. She after joined St Catherine Girls School (currently Dr. Obote College), Kyebambe Girls and then Makerere University where she attained Bachelors in Sociology & Religious Studies. She then joined University of Nairobi for her Masters in Religious Studies.

Political career 
When she came to Parliament in 1996, first she became a vice chairperson on the committee on Foreign Affairs, and by the time Yoweri Museveni appointed her minister of state for Internal Affairs between1999 to 2003. She was the chairperson of the Parliamentary Committee on Foreign Affairs.

She spearheaded and initiated the process to censure Mr Kirunda Kivejinja who was then the minister of Transport and Communications on accusations of mismanaging thousands of litres of automobile fuel. This was during Ms Kiyingi’s first term in Parliament.

Controversies 
Sarah Kiyingi, Eriya Kategaya, Bidandi Ssali, Miria Matembe and Namusoke where fired from Cabinet/ministerial positions by Yoweri Museveni and one of the reasons he gave for their sacking was that they contradicted the position of the National Resistance Movement on the third term. It was also said that these had gone against Yoweri Meseveni's proposal of National constitutional amendment for the term limit.

In April 2021, Musoke was said to have also initiated an online petition that was aimed at  challenging the allocation of 10 billion Shillings to members of parliament, to allegedly fight the spread of Coronavirus.

See also 
Rakai District
Juliet Kyinyamatama Suubi
National Resistance Movement
Eriya Kategaya
Miria Matembe

References

External links 
Rakai District Local Government

Living people
National Resistance Movement politicians
Women members of the Parliament of Uganda
Members of the Parliament of Uganda
21st-century Ugandan politicians
21st-century Ugandan women politicians
Makerere University alumni
1960 births
1960 by country